The 1927–28 season  was the 30th in the history of the Southern League. The league consisted of Eastern and Western Divisions. Kettering Town won the Eastern Division and Bristol City reserves won the Western Division. Kettering were declared Southern League champions after defeating Bristol City reserves 5–0 in a championship play-off.

Two clubs from the Southern League applied to join the Football League, although neither was successful. Three clubs (all from the Western Division) left the league at the end of the season.

Eastern Division

A total of 18 teams contest the division, including 12 sides from previous season and six new teams.

Newly elected teams:
 Chatham Town - returned to the league after the resignation in 1921
 Northfleet United - returned to the league after the resignation in 1898
 Sheppey United - returned to the league after the resignation in 1901
 Aldershot Town
 Sittingbourne
 Gillingham II - returned to the league after the resignation in 1922

Western Division

A total of 16 teams contest the division, including 13 sides from previous season and three new teams.

Team relegated from 1926–27 Football League
 Aberdare & Aberaman Athletic - relegated from the Football League and renamed

Newly elected teams:
 Merthyr Town II 
 Torquay United II - replacing their first team, who had been promoted to the Football League the previous season

Football League election
Two Southern League clubs, Kettering Town and Peterborough & Fletton United, applied to join the Football League. However, both League clubs were re-elected, with Argonauts, a new amateur club who had never played a match winning more votes than either Southern League club.

References

1927-28
4
1927–28 in Welsh football